Chen Kuei-jen (born 6 July 1968) is a Taiwanese football (soccer) manager and former player. He is the manager of Taiwan Power Company F.C. He has been assistant coach to Dido and Lee Po-hung in Chinese Taipei national football team.

Managerial history 
 Taiwan Power Company F.C., ?-present
 Chinese Taipei national football team (assistant coach), 2005
 Chinese Taipei national futsal team, 2006-2007

References 

1968 births
Living people
Taiwanese footballers
Taiwanese football managers
Association football midfielders
Taiwan Power Company F.C. players
Chinese Taipei international footballers
Chinese Taipei national football team managers